Mingoola is a locality in the New England region of New South Wales, Australia.

In 2016, Mingoola was the site for a pioneering refugee resettlement program. The program involved the resettlement of refugees from Africa to live and work in Mingoola. The program has been seen as an opportunity for refugees and small rural communities alike. However, by 2019, all of the refugees had left Mingoola due to drought making farming and farm jobs unviable, medical conditions that required being closer to specialists, and lack of water again due to the drought.

References

Towns in New South Wales
Tenterfield Shire
Towns in New England (New South Wales)